is a railway station in Ōita City, Ōita Prefecture, Japan. It is operated by JR Kyushu and is on the Hōhi Main Line.

Lines

Layout 
The station consists of a side platform serving a single track. The station building is a modern wooden structure equipped with a staffed ticket window, an automatic vending machine and a SUGOCA card reader.

Management of the station has been outsourced to the JR Kyushu Tetsudou Eigyou Co., a wholly owned subsidiary of JR Kyushu specialising in station services. It staffs the ticket booth which is equipped with a POS machine but does not have a Midori no Madoguchi facility.

Adjacent stations

History
JR Kyushu (JNR) opened the station on 23 March 2002 as an additional station on the existing track of the Hōhi Main Line.

In February 2018, JR Kyushu announced that the station would become unstaffed in the autumn of 2018 after completing barrier-free improvements and introducing the "Smart Support" remote station management scheme.

Passenger statistics
In fiscal 2016, the station was used by an average of 1,604 passengers daily (boarding passengers only), and it ranked 113th among the busiest stations of JR Kyushu.

See also
List of railway stations in Japan

References

External links
Ōita-Daigaku-mae (JR Kyushu)

Railway stations in Ōita Prefecture
Railway stations in Japan opened in 2002
Ōita (city)